The 1947–48 BAA season was the Capitols' 2nd season in the BAA (which later became the NBA).

Draft picks

Roster

Regular season

Season standings

Record vs. opponents

Game log

Playoffs

Western Division tiebreaker

Chicago Stags vs. Washington Capitols: Stags win series 1-0
Game 1 @ Chicago (March 23): Chicago 74, Washington 70

References 

Washington Capitols seasons
Washington
Washington
Washington